Hoyt Peak is a  summit located on the shared border of Yellowstone National Park and North Absaroka Wilderness, in Park County, Wyoming.

It was named for John Wesley Hoyt (1831–1912), third Governor of Wyoming Territory. The mountain's name was officially adopted in 1895 by the United States Board on Geographic Names.

Sylvan Pass forms the low point of the saddle between Hoyt Peak and Top Notch Peak.

Climate 
According to the Köppen climate classification system, Hoyt Peak is located in a subarctic climate zone with long, cold, snowy winters, and mild summers. Winter temperatures can drop below −10 °F with wind chill factors below −30 °F.

See also
 List of mountains and mountain ranges of Yellowstone National Park

References

External links

 Weather forecast: Hoyt Peak

Mountains of Park County, Wyoming
Mountains of Wyoming
North American 3000 m summits
Mountains of Yellowstone National Park